Marion High School is a public high school located in Marion, Texas (USA).  It is part of the Marion Independent School District located in west central Guadalupe County and classified as a 3A school by the UIL.  In 2015, the school was rated "Met Standard" by the Texas Education Agency.

Athletics
The Marion Bulldogs compete in cross country, volleyball, football, basketball, golf, tennis, track, softball and baseball.

State titles
Girls Cross Country - 
1989(2A)
Girls Basketball - 
1993(2A)
One Act Play - 
1989(2A)

State finals appearances   
Girls Basketball - 
1990(2A)

References

External links
Marion ISD

Public high schools in Texas
Schools in Guadalupe County, Texas